Fierce, Isakowitz and Blalock is a Washington D.C. Republican government relations consulting firm.

Client list 

 Airbus
 American Forest & Paper Association
 American Gaming Association
 American Insurance Association
 American Pork Export Council 
 American Television Alliance 
 American Wind Energy Association
 Apple Inc.
 Apria Healthcare
 Bipartisan Policy Center Advocacy Network
 BP America
 Business Roundtable
 Coalition for Patent Fairness
 Coca-Cola
 Corporate Health Care Coalition
 CTIA - The Wireless Association
 Delta Air Lines, Inc
 EADS North America
 Edison International
 Facebook
 Federal Home Loan Bank of San Francisco
 Federation of American Hospitals
 Ford Motor Company
 FWD.us
 Generic Pharmaceutical Association
 The Home Depot
 JP Morgan Chase
 Kellogg's
 Magazine Publishers of America
 Managed Funds Association
 Medco Health Solutions
 MillerCoors Brewing Company
 Momenta Pharmaceuticals, Inc.
 Moore Capital Management
 Mutual of Omaha
 National Cable & Telecommunications Association
 National Pork Producers Council
 New York Private Bank & Trust
 NFL Players Association
 Noble Energy
 Och Ziff Capital Management
 Oracle
 Recording Industry Association of America
 Retail Industry Leaders Association
 Republic of Korea
 Sprint
 Time Warner Cable
 Union Pacific
 UnitedHealth Group
 US Chamber of Commerce
 URS Division of Washington
 Watson Pharmaceuticals Inc.
 Zurich International

See also
 Lobbying in the United States

Notes

References 
 The Hill The Hill Staff (14 May 2009) Top Lobbyists: Hired Guns 
 Roll Call Anna Palmer (2 February 2009)  The All-GOP Firm: It Ain't Dead Yet
 The Washington Post Jeffrey Birnbaum (25 September 2007) Tech Industry Builds Lobbying Machine for Patent Fight
 The Hill (24 April 2007) The new sheriffs in town
 The Hill (12 September 2006) Kirsten Chadwick, one of the best vote counters on K Street
 The Hill Jonathan Kaplan 27 April 2005 Top Lobbyists - Hired Guns
 Roll Call Brody Mullins (28 Oct. 2004)  In ‘Ground Game’ Election, K Street Hits the Road

External links
 Fierce, Isakowitz and Blalock

Lobbying firms